"I Engineer" is a 1986 song by American new wave band Animotion. In the song, the protagonist says to his enemy in the form of the lyrical ego, that he will win.

After the release, the song was a commercial success in Europe (#2 in Germany, among other chart positions), but was less of a hit in the United States.

Music video 

The video for "I Engineer" was shot in Blackheath, England in the abandoned Royal Herbert Hospital. 

There are also scenes crossing London Bridge, with the iconic building of the Financial Times newspaper in the background and people walking towards the City.  Joined with the song lyrics, this may point to a criticism of banking or business culture.

Track listings 
7" Single
 I Engineer – 4:02	
 The Essence – 4:06	

12" Single				
 I Engineer (Remix) – 5:53	
 I Engineer (Dub Version) – 5:08	
 Obsession (Remix) – 7:30

Charts

Cover versions 

1986: Michael Damian
1990: Camouflage
2003: 2 DJ's & One
2007: Bangbros

References 

1986 singles
Songs written by Mike Chapman
Songs written by Holly Knight
Songs with lyrics by Bernie Taupin
Animotion songs
Song recordings produced by Richie Zito
Mercury Records singles